Chaling County is a county in Hunan Province, China; it is under the administration of Zhuzhou City. Located on the south eastern margin of the province, the county is bordered to the north by You County, to the east by Anren County, to the south by Yanling County, to the east by Lianhua, Yongxin Counties and Jinggangshan City of Jiangxi. The county has 4 subdistricts, 10 towns and 2 townships under its jurisdiction, the county seat is at Yunyang Subdistrict.

Subdivisions

In the present, Chaling County has 4 subdistricts, 10 towns and 2 townships.
4 subdistricts
 Mijiang
 Sicong
 Xiadong
 Yunyang

10 towns
 Gaolong
 Huju
 Hukou
 Huotian
 Jieshou
 Majiang
 Yantang
 Yaolu
 Zaoshi
 Zhitang

2 towns
 Lingfang
 Taokeng

Climate

References

www.xzqh.org 

 
County-level divisions of Hunan
Zhuzhou